Bilabria is a genus of marine ray-finned fishes belonging to the family Zoarcidae, the eelpouts. The fishes in this genus are found in the northwestern Pacific Ocean.

Species
The following species are classified within the genus Bilabria:

References

Gymnelinae